David Altmejd (born 1974) is a Canadian sculptor who lives and works in Los Angeles. He creates highly detailed sculptures that often blur the distinction between interior and exterior, surface and structure, figurative representation and abstraction.

Early life and education
Born in Montreal, Quebec, Altmejd earned a Bachelor of Fine Arts from the Université du Québec à Montréal. Altmejd completed his Masters of Fine Arts at Columbia University in 2001.

Work
Altmejd's sculptures present viewers with an amalgam of organic random objects such as decapitated werewolf heads with graffiti-style Stars of David, towers made of mirrors, plastic flowers and costume jewelry as creative tools for sculptural systems loaded with what he calls "symbolic potential" and "open-ended" narratives.  Werewolf heads appear frequently in his work which in the contemporary art world are widely recognized as being closely recognized with the Canadian creator and visionary. They featured prominently in his 2011 solo exhibition at the Brant Foundation, Art Study Centre, Greenwich, Connecticut, including many other sculpture platforms. Literary figures and popular cultural icons are central to his art and have been seen as in some way resembling the artist, such as Louise Bourgeois, Kiki Smith, Matthew Barney, Paul McCarthy, Minimalist artist Sol LeWitt and Donald Judd, and novelists and filmmakers, David Cronenberg, Jorge Luis Borges, and Mary Shelley.

Kara L. Rooney writes of his work, The Vessel (2011), the central piece in his March 2011 show at Andrea Rosen Gallery:

In 2016 Altmejd designed the art for Yeasayer's album Amen & Goodbye which the band described as "Sgt Pepper meets Hieronymous Bosch meets Dalí meets PeeWee's Playhouse."

Exhibitions
Since graduating with an MFA, Altmejd has taken part in many solo and group exhibitions globally, including numerous exhibitions with galleries that represented his work, Andrea Rosen Gallery, N.Y., and Stuart Shave/Modern Art, London. In 2003, he participated in the 8th International Istanbul Biennial, Poetic Justice curated by Dan Cameron; in 2004, he was included in the Whitney Biennial of American Art curated by the team composed of Chrissie Illes, Shamim M. Momin and Debra Singer to showcase new art made in America. In addition to these exhibitions, he had a solo exhibition at Oakville Galleries in Gairloch Gardens, Metamorphosis (2007) curated by Louise Déry and organized as a travelling exhibition to Galérie de l'UQAM, Montreal, QC, Canada, and the Illingworth Kerr Gallery, Alberta College of Art and Design, Calgary, Alberta.

In 2007 Altmejd represented Canada at the Venice Biennale; his installation The Index and The Giant, was commissioned by curator, Louise Déry for the Canadian pavilion. The sculpture installation was subsequently purchased by the Art Gallery of Ontario, Toronto, and a second part of the installation was acquired by a private collector in Greece.

His work has appeared in major exhibitions at the National Gallery of Canada, Ottawa (2010), the New Museum (2010) and the Solomon R. Guggenheim Museum (2010); the Brant Foundation Art Study Center (2011); MOCA Cleveland, Cleveland (2012); Musée d’Art Moderne de la Ville de Paris, Paris (2015); the Louisiana Museum of Modern Art, Humlebaek (2015); the Mudam Luxembourg, Musée d’art moderne Grand- Duc Jean, Luxembourg (2015-2016); and the Royal Museums of Fine Arts of Belgium, Brussels (2016). From an early date, his work was featured in contemporary Canadian group exhibitions, Artifice 98 at the Saidye Bronfman Art Center, Montreal (1998), the Québec Triennial at the Musée d'art contemporain de Montréal, Montreal (2008); Intrus/Intruders at the Musée national des beaux-arts du Québec, Quebec City (2008) and many more cultural venues.

Art market
Altmejd is represented by Xavier Hufkens, White Cube (since 2018) and David Kordansky Gallery (since 2020) He previously worked with Andrea Rosen Gallery.

Documentary 
 2012 - Chaorismatique, David Altmejd, sculpteur (dir. Rénald Bellemare)

References

Bibliography

External links

Xavier Hufkens: David Altmejd
White Cube
Musée d'Art Moderne de la Ville de Paris: David Altmejd
Louisiana Museum of Modern Art: David Altmejd
Royal Museums of Fine Arts Belgium: David Altmejd
Interview (2007)
An Interview with David Altmejd by Randy Gladman from C International Contemporary Art Magazine, Summer 2004.
Venice Biennale (2007): David Altmejd ry,
Glenbow: David Altmejd : The Vessel

1974 births
Artists from Montreal
21st-century Canadian sculptors
Canadian male sculptors
21st-century Canadian male artists
Canadian contemporary artists
Columbia University School of the Arts alumni
Living people
Sculptors from Quebec
Université du Québec à Montréal alumni